Dan Olaru (born 11 November 1996 in Chişinău, Moldova) is a Moldovan  archer. At the 2012 Summer Olympics he competed for his country in the Men's individual event. He went on to represent his country again at the 2020 Summer Olympics, in the Men's individual event, and Mixed team event.

References

External links
 
 

1996 births
Living people
Moldovan male archers
Olympic archers of Moldova
Archers at the 2012 Summer Olympics
Archers at the 2015 European Games
European Games competitors for Moldova
Archers at the 2019 European Games
Archers at the 2020 Summer Olympics
21st-century Moldovan people